Santali cinema also known as Sollywood, has its presence in the Indian states of Jharkhand, West Bengal, Assam, Orissa, and parts of Nepal (especially Jhapa District and Morang District), where Santals live. Santali films are made in the Santali language.

History
Although some initiatives have been taken to support Santali cinema, allowing it to prosper, only three films managed to make it to the big screen : Chando Likhon, which was released in 2001, was the first film to be made on 35 mm movie film; second in this series was Sagun Ena Sohag Dular (2003), which was loosely based on the 1982 Bollywood film Nadiya Ke Paar; Jewee Jurie (Life Partner) (2009) was produced by SBT Movie Craft and released widely in the states of Jharkhand, Odisha, and others.

Bonodal (The Change) (2016), Nepal's first historic Santali feature film, was produced and directed by Kiran Khatiwada.

Overview

Santali cinema has not been able to create an identity as a film industry like most other cinemas in India. Every year about 8 to 10 films are made and released directly, on CDs only.
None of them are released in cinema halls, due to low budget and least support of state government in development of the cinema. Music albums are preferred over video films, as the budget is very low and production cost is easily recovered. The number of these ranges from 10 to 20.
Santali cinema has a good scope in the states of Jharkhand, West Bengal, Assam and Odisha the majority of its viewers reside in these regions.

Present status

As there is no film development corporation in Jharkhand, the Santali film industry is in an unremarkable position, and due to this, films and music albums are made less in number and distributed inefficiently, due to cost and other reasons.

In Jharkhand, Dhanbad, Jamshedpur and their surroundings, don't have proper cinema halls and ticket prices are very low compared to multiplexes all over India. So releasing a film in cinema halls is not very profitable.

Santali films
 Sondhayni (2019) directed by Seral Murmu
 Raawah (2017) directed by Seral Murmu
 Chando Likhon (The Script Of God) (2001) first film to be made on 35 mm film
 Hai Re Aree Chali (Alas! Our Customs) (2004)
 Jewee Jurie (2009)
 Sita Nala Re Sagun Supari screened at the second edition of Nepal International Indigenous Film Festival, 2008
 Poran Porayni
 Bir Manani
 Sabarnaka Surubali (2018) - directed by Shyam Sundar Majhi
 Karo Kuili (2018)
 Mogod Dulaar (Love Unexpressed) (2009) 
 Aamge Sari Dulariya (2012)
 Bardu (2014
Sagai (2014) directed by Raj Lakhan

Suluk (2013)
Arjun (2019) - Directed by Reema Noopur 
Sona Miru (2022)
 Bonodal (The Change) (2016) directed and produced by Kiran Khatiwada; Nepal's first historic Santali feature film
Kiryo (2012) - directed by Sibaji Baskey

References

Cinema of Jharkhand
Cinema by language of India
Culture of Jharkhand
https://www.imdb.com/title/tt11835068/
https://mediaindia.eu/cinema/films-of-tribal-in-india/
https://www.imdb.com/title/tt11835068/